Kyle Hix (born September 23, 1988) is a former American football offensive tackle. He was signed by the New England Patriots as an undrafted free agent in 2011. He played college football at Texas.

Early life 
Hix was a three-sport athlete at Aledo High School. He earned all-district honors in football, basketball and track & field.

College career 
Hix attended the University of Texas at Austin where he played college football for the Texas Longhorns. As a true freshman, Hix played in 13 games, including one start at right guard against No. 12 Arizona State in the Holiday Bowl. During his sophomore season, Hix started all 13 games at right tackle. As a junior, Hix started 14 games at right tackle. He was named an All-Big 12 honorable mention by the Associated Press and conference coaches. 

Prior to his senior season, Hix was a member of the Outland Trophy preseason watch list. Hix went on to start 11 games at left tackle in 2010, missing one due to injury.

Professional career

New England Patriots 
Hix went undrafted in the 2011 NFL Draft and signed with the New England Patriots as a rookie free agent. He was released by the Patriots in February of 2013 without having ever played a snap in the NFL.

References 

Living people
1988 births
Texas Longhorns football players
Players of American football from Fort Worth, Texas
New England Patriots players
American football offensive tackles